Classical period may refer to: 

Classical Greece, specifically of the 5th and 4th centuries BCE
Classical antiquity, in the Greco-Roman world
Classical India, a historic period of India (c. 322 BCE - c. 550 CE)
Classical period (music), in music
Classic stage, of American archaeology

ja:古典期